Palo Alto Senior High School, commonly referred to locally as "Paly", is a comprehensive public high school in Palo Alto, California. Operated by the Palo Alto Unified School District, the school is one of two schools in the district, the other being crosstown Gunn High School, for which the school has a rivalry with.

Palo Alto High School was originally established as a private school in 1894. The school was later established as a public school four years later, and a new campus was built in 1918. The school's property is adjacent to Stanford University, who provided the land for the school.

The school admits roughly 500 students each year and features various extracurriculars, including a variety of student-led publications, glassblowing, robotics, and a theater program. It is a two-time National Blue Ribbon School.

History

Palo Alto Senior High School initially opened in 1894 as a private school. At the time of its opening, the school consisted of 24 students to 3 teachers. The school would later become a public school in 1918. Classes were initially held in the Channing Avenue Grammar School; a three-room high school was later built using funds from a trustee. An expanded campus began construction in 1917 and finished construction by December 1918.

Demographics

2021–22

 2,010 students: 1,090 Male (54.2%), 1,051 (45.8%)

2015–16
 1,994 students: 982 Male (49.6%), 1004 Female (50.4%)

Standardized testing

Student media
In October 2014, a new Media Arts Center (MAC) was unveiled at Paly. The MAC is the hub of journalism at Palo Alto High School.

Year-round student publications 
These publications have a dedicated class associated with them.

The Campanile is the high school's newspaper. It prints 24 broadsheet pages once every three weeks. The Campanile has been in the National Scholastic Press Association Hall of Fame since 2004, and has also won four Pacemaker awards as well as a West regional award for editorial excellence from Time.
C Magazine is the high school Arts and Culture Magazine. C Magazine has won a Gold Crown award from Columbia Scholastic Press Association in 2015 and 2016.
Verde is Paly's school magazine publication, founded in 1999. It is published five times each year and available online. Verde has won Pacemaker and Gold Crown awards for scholastic journalism, including the 2005 Gold Crown award in the Newspaper category. In 2006 Verde won the Best in Show at National Journalism Convention held in San Francisco. In 2008 Verde was one of four newsmagazines awarded the Pacemaker award from the National Scholastic Press Association.
Viking is Paly's sports magazine publication, published five times each year and available online. Founded in 2007, Viking was the first publication at the high school level to solely cover athletics in the country. It won the National Scholastic Press Association's Student Journalist Impact Award in 2008.
The Paly Voice, launched in 2003, is Paly's online news source. It features searchable archives of all other Paly publications as well as exclusive online content. In the spring of 2005, the site won both the People's Voice and Overall Webby Award in the "Student" category.
InFocus is Paly's broadcast TV news program. Founded in 1998, it airs daily during school.
Madrono,  the Palo Alto High School yearbook founded around 1918, has won numerous awards; one of the most prestigious being a gold medalist for the Columbia Scholastic Press Association. It will publish its 103rd issue in 2022.

Additional student publications 
These publications are clubs but do not have a dedicated class.

Proof is Paly's arts and entertainment magazine. It was first published second semester of the 2009–10 school year.
Agora is Paly's foreign affairs magazine. First published in 2012, it is the first high school foreign affairs publication in the country. It publishes once a semester.
Littera is Paly's club literary magazine. The club was created in the fall of 2018. It publishes an online issue every semester.

Athletics
Titles won by teams from Palo Alto High School range from CIF State Championships in Boys Varsity Basketball in 1993 and 2006, a football Division I state championship in 2010, volleyball Division I state championships in 2010 and 2011, to CCS Championships in Football in 1995, 2006, 2007, 2010, and 2022  and countless CCS titles in other sports.  In 2010, both the Boys and Girls Lacrosse teams won the inaugural Santa Clara Valley Athletic League Championships.

Paly has 25 varsity teams, including football, swimming, as well as badminton, softball, basketball, track and field/cross country running, golf, lacrosse, soccer, tennis, volleyball, water polo, field hockey, ice hockey, and wrestling teams. The school is also home to several athletic clubs, including an Ultimate Frisbee Club.

Notable alumni

Palo Alto High School has had various well-known alumni, including:

Davante Adams (2011), NFL wide receiver
Rink Babka (1954), Olympic discus thrower
Joan Baez (1958), folk singer
Lisa Brennan-Jobs (1996), writer and daughter of Steve Jobs.
Charles Brenner (1961), APL implementer and forensic mathematician
Ron "Money-B" Brooks (1987), rapper (Digital Underground)
Ron Christie, Republican political strategist.
Birge Clark (1910), architect
Whitfield Crane (1986), rock singer (Ugly Kid Joe)
Aarón Díaz (2001),  Mexican-American actor and model (Quantico)
Tim Dickinson (1992), political journalist (Rolling Stone, Mother Jones)
Margot Early (1982), romance author
Dave Feldman (1983), sportscaster (CSN Bay Area)
Karen Joy Fowler (1968), author (The Jane Austen Book Club)
Dave Franco (2003), actor (Scrubs, 21 Jump Street, Now You See Me)
James Franco (1996), actor (Spider-Man trilogy, Pineapple Express, Milk, 127 Hours)
Tom Franco (1998), artist
Erle Stanley Gardner (1909), detective fiction author & creator of Perry Mason
Ariel Gore, writer, she attended for two years and has written about the experience.
Charles Haid (1961), actor and director, (played Andy Renko on TV series Hill Street Blues)
Jim Harbaugh (1982), football player and coach, current head coach at the University of Michigan
Peter Hansen (1997), football coach
Douglas Hofstadter (1961), professor of cognitive science and author
Allan Hoover (1925), financier, son of President Herbert Hoover
Jon Huntsman, Sr. (1955), billionaire founder of Huntsman Corporation
KeeSean Johnson (2014), football player
Ollie Johnston (1930), Academy Award-winning Disney animator (Snow White and the Seven Dwarfs, Fantasia)
Morris Kirksey (1913), gold medal-winning sprinter and rugby player at the 1920 Summer Olympics
Bill Kreutzmann (1965), drummer (Grateful Dead)
Bill Lane, Sunset magazine publisher, American diplomat, and philanthropist
Cory Lerios, founding member of the band Pablo Cruise
Jeremy Lin (2006), basketball player
Jim Loscutoff (1948), basketball player, won seven NBA championships with the Boston Celtics
John Markoff (1967), New York Times journalist and author
Ron "Pigpen" McKernan (1963), musician (Grateful Dead) (didn't graduate)
Rob Minkoff (1980), film director and animator (The Lion King, Stuart Little)
Sean Nolan (1990), Olympic water polo team, Sydney 2000
Jesse Moss (1988), documentary filmmaker
Hank Norberg, football player
Teresa Noyola (2008), soccer player
Téa Obreht (2002), novelist (The Tiger's Wife)
Luke Paquin (1996), guitarist (Hot Hot Heat)
Joc Pederson (2010), Major League Baseball player (Los Angeles Dodgers, Chicago Cubs, Atlanta Braves, San Francisco Giants)
Stu Pederson (1978), Major League Baseball player (Los Angeles Dodgers)
Bill Pidto (1983), sportscaster (ESPN, MSG Network)
Keith Raffel (1968), technology executive, novelist, US Senate aide
Tom Ritchey (1974), (Ritchey Design), cycling engineer and pioneer of the mountain bike
Dave Schultz (1977), 3x NCAA Champion, Olympic and world champion wrestler
Mark Schultz (1978), 3x NCAA Champion, Olympic and world champion wrestler
Joe Sebok (1995), professional poker player
Joe Simitian (1970), California State Senator (2004–12) and former California State Assemblyman (2000–04)
Grace Slick (1958), rock singer (Jefferson Airplane) (attended 1–2 years, but graduated from Castilleja)
Tom Stern (1964), Oscar-nominated cinematographer (Million Dollar Baby, Mystic River, Changeling)
Dink Templeton (1915), multi-sport athlete, 1920 Olympic gold medalist and Hall of Fame Stanford track & field coach
Christopher Tin (1994), Grammy Award winning composer
Lew Welch, Beat poet, educator, and writer
Tad Williams (1975), author (Memory, Sorrow, and Thorn, Otherland, and Shadowmarch science fiction/fantasy series)
Kirk Wise (1981), film director/animator (Beauty and the Beast, Atlantis: The Lost Empire)
Remi Wolf (2014), Pop/funk singer-songwriter 
Ron Wyden (1967), U.S. Senator from Oregon (1996– )
Lily Zhang (2014), U.S. Olympic table tennis player, London 2012
Jan Zobel (1965), accountant and LGBTQ community organizer in Bay Area

See also
 Gunn High School, Palo Alto's other high school
 Cubberley High School, Palo Alto's now-defunct third high school

References

External links

 Palo Alto High School official website

Palo Alto Unified School District
Educational institutions established in 1898
High schools in Santa Clara County, California
Public high schools in California
Buildings and structures in Palo Alto, California
1898 establishments in California